La Zarza is a Spanish municipality in the province of Badajoz, Extremadura.

References

External links 
  
 Profile 

Municipalities in the Province of Badajoz